The Blindheimsvik Wildlife Sanctuary is located on the south side of Vigra island in the municipality of Giske in Møre og Romsdal county, Norway.

The area received protection in 1988 "to preserve an important wetland area with its habitat, bird life and other wildlife," according to the conservation regulations. The area consists of a long shallow bay with large tidal areas. Many small streams empty into the bay, where there are beach meadow areas rich in various species. The bay is important as a resting place for ducks and waders, and as an overwintering site and nesting site for wetland birds. Twenty bird species of international importance and three species of national importance have been observed here.

The wildlife sanctuary is one of six natural areas that were included in the Giske Wetlands System Ramsar site, which was established in 1996.

References

External links
 Mijlø-direktoratet: Blindheimsvik. Map and description of the nature reserve.
 Miljøverndepartementet. 1987. Blindheimsvik fuglefredningsområde, Giske kommune, Møre og Romsdal fylke. 1:5,000 map of the wildlife sanctuary.
 Forskrift om vern av Blindheimsvik fuglefredingsområde, Giske kommune, Møre og Romsdal. 1988.

Nature reserves in Norway
Ramsar sites in Norway
Protected areas of Møre og Romsdal
Giske
Protected areas established in 1988